Martín Ríos may refer to:

 Martín Ríos (footballer) (born 1977), Argentine footballer
 Martín Ríos (judoka) (born 1978), Argentine judoka
 Martín Malagón Ríos (born 1964), Mexican politician

See also
 Martin Rios (born 1981), Spanish-Swiss curler